1886 in sports describes the year's events in world sport.

Athletics
USA Outdoor Track and Field Championships

American football
College championship
 College football national championship – Yale Bulldogs

Association football
England
 Arsenal FC founded as Dial Square FC by munitions workers from the Royal Arsenal at Woolwich in southeast London.  Dial Square is the name of one of their workshops.  At the end of the year, the players hold a pub meeting and change the club's name to Royal Arsenal.  Five years later, the name is changed to Woolwich Arsenal.  The club's present name will be adopted in 1914 after the move to Islington.
 13 March — Tinsley Lindley scores in the first of his record 9 consecutive England games
 10 May — The Football Association approves a proposal made by N. Lane Jackson, an Old Corinthian, that players be given a cap for every international match in which they take part.
 FA Cup final – Blackburn Rovers 2–0 West Bromwich Albion at The Oval; replay after 0–0 draw at The Oval.  This is Blackburn's third successive victory and the final is the first to feature two extant members of The Football League.
 December 11 – Dial Square F.C., later to become Arsenal FC (see above)), play their first match, a 6–0 win over the Eastern Wanderers.
Ireland
 March — Linfield F.C. is formed in Belfast.
Scotland
 20 March — John Lambie becomes the youngest Scotland player and captain, aged 17 years and 92 days.
 May 17— Motherwell Football Club is formed.
 Scottish Cup final – Queen's Park 3–1 Renton
Switzerland
 Grasshopper Club Zürich founded.

Baseball
National championship
 National League v. American Association – St Louis AA defeats Chicago NL, 4 games to 2.
Events
 The Sporting News established in St. Louis.  It becomes the dominant American publication covering baseball, so much so that it acquires the nickname "The Bible of Baseball".

Boxing
Events
 The inaugural World Lightweight Champion is Jack McAuliffe, generally recognised following his 21st-round knockout of Billy Frazier at Boston.  Lightweights weigh 130 to 135 pounds.  McAuliffe will hold the title until he retires undefeated in 1893.
 Jack Nonpareil Dempsey retains the World Middleweight Championship when he knocks out George LaBlanche in 13 rounds at Larchmont, NY.
 John L. Sullivan knocks out Paddy Ryan in the third round at San Francisco.  Sullivan retains the World Heavyweight Championship.
Lineal world champions
 World Heavyweight Championship – John L. Sullivan
 World Middleweight Championship – Jack Nonpareil Dempsey
 World Lightweight Championship – Jack McAuliffe

Cricket
Events
 Somerset does not play against any other first-class counties and drops out of the County Championship until 1891.
 Hampshire ceases to be a first-class county after years of difficult circumstances and poor results. They do play matches against Surrey and Sussex in 1886 but these matches are not recognised as first-class. Hampshire will not recover first-class status until the beginning of the 1895 season when they will be readmitted to the County Championship.
England
 Champion County –  Nottinghamshire (fourth consecutive season)
 Most runs – W. G. Grace 1,846 @ 35.50 (HS 170)
 Most wickets – George Lohmann 160 @ 15.15 (BB 8–43)
Australia
 Most runs – John McIlwraith 315 @ 78.75 (HS 133)
 Most wickets – Fred Spofforth 18 @ 15.22 (BB 5–43)

Field hockey
Events
 18 January — modern field hockey is born with the formation of the Hockey Association in England, which codifies the sport's rules

Gaelic Athletic Association
Events
 Wexford GAA becomes the first of the 32 GAA county boards

Golf
Major tournaments
 British Open – David Brown
Other tournaments
 British Amateur – Horace Hutchinson

Horse racing
England
 Grand National – Old Joe
 1,000 Guineas Stakes – Miss Jummy
 2,000 Guineas Stakes – Ormonde
 The Derby – Ormonde
 The Oaks – Miss Jummy
 St. Leger Stakes – Ormonde
Australia
 Melbourne Cup – Arsenal
Canada
 Queen's Plate – Wild Rose
Ireland
 Irish Grand National – Castle Lucas
 Irish Derby Stakes – Theodemir
USA
 Kentucky Derby – Ben Ali
 Preakness Stakes – The Bard
 Belmont Stakes – Inspector B

Ice hockey
Events
 8 December — world's first championship ice hockey league, the Amateur Hockey Association of Canada (AHAC) is formed at a meeting in Montreal

Rowing
The Boat Race
 3 April — Cambridge wins the 43rd Oxford and Cambridge Boat Race

Rugby football
Home Nations Championship
 The 4th series is shared by Scotland and England who win two matches each.

Tennis
England
 Wimbledon Men's Singles Championship – William Renshaw (GB) defeats Herbert Lawford (GB) 6–0 5–7 6–3 6–4
 Wimbledon Women's Singles Championship – Blanche Bingley (GB) defeats Maud Watson (GB) 6–3 6–3
USA
 American Men's Singles Championship – Richard D. Sears (USA) defeats R. Livingston Beeckman (USA) 4–6 6–1 6–3 6–4
World
 The 10th pre-open era Men's Tennis tour gets underway 85 tournaments are staged this year the tour runs from 24 April to 12 November 1886.

Yacht racing
America's Cup
 The New York Yacht Club retains the America's Cup as Mayflower defeats British challenger Galatea, of the Royal Northern Yacht Club, 2 races to 0

References

 
Sports by year